Mount Cannon is located in the Lewis Range, Glacier National Park in the U.S. state of Montana.  Formerly called Goat Mountain it was renamed for the leading physiologist Dr. Walter Bradford Cannon and his wife Cornelia, who made the first recorded ascent of the mountain in 1901.

Geology

Like other mountains in Glacier National Park, Cannon is composed of sedimentary rock laid down during the Precambrian to Jurassic periods.

Climate

Based on the Köppen climate classification, Cannon is located in a subarctic climate characterized by long, usually very cold winters, and short, cool to mild summers. Temperatures can drop below −10 °F with wind chill factors below −30 °F.

See also
 Mountains and mountain ranges of Glacier National Park (U.S.)
 Geology of the Rocky Mountains

References

Gallery

Mountains of Flathead County, Montana
Mountains of Glacier National Park (U.S.)
Lewis Range
Mountains of Montana